John Francis Hamtramck Claiborne (April 24, 1809 – May 17, 1884) was a member of the U. S. House of Representatives from Mississippi. He wrote a history of Mississippi.

Biography
Claiborne was named after Jean François Hamtramck and was the son of Ferdinand Claiborne. He was also a nephew of William Charles Cole Claiborne and Nathaniel Herbert Claiborne, grandnephew of Thomas Claiborne, great-grandfather of Herbert Claiborne Pell, Jr., great-great-grandfather of Claiborne de Borda Pell, and great-great-grand-uncle of Corinne Claiborne Boggs.

He was born in Natchez, Mississippi and attended school in Virginia, where he studied law.

He was admitted to the bar in 1825, and commenced the practice of law at Natchez. He owned slaves. He was a member of the state House of Representatives from 1830 to 1834, then moved to Madison County, Mississippi, and was elected as a Jacksonian to the Twenty-fourth Congress, where he was a Representative from March 4, 1835 to March 3, 1837.

Claiborne presented credentials as a member-elect to the Twenty-fifth Congress and served from July 18, 1837, until February 5, 1838, when the seat was declared vacant as the result of a contested election. He then engaged in newspaper work in Natchez. In 1842, Claiborne served as a commissioner on the Choctaws Claim Commission which was set up to disperse land after the Treaty of Dancing Rabbit Creek. Claiborne was given his position on the commission due to the fact that he was owed $30,000 by William M. Gwin and Abram A. Halsey, who were also on the commission. Gwin and Halsey planned to give Claiborne 32,000 acres of Choctaw lands to cover their debts. The land deal was never completed and due to a public feud, Claiborne was removed from the commission. In 1844, he moved to New Orleans, Louisiana and resumed newspaper interests.

He was appointed United States timber agent for Louisiana and Mississippi in 1853. He was the author of several historical works including his 1880 History of Mississippi.

He returned to his estate, "Dumbarton", near Natchez, and died there on May 17, 1884. He is buried in Trinity Churchyard, Natchez, Mississippi.

References

External links

Life of J. F. H. Claiborne (1903), by Franklin Lafayette Riley
 Mississippi, as a province, territory, and state : with biographical notices of eminent citizens

1809 births
1884 deaths
Politicians from Natchez, Mississippi
Claiborne family
American people of English descent
Jacksonian members of the United States House of Representatives from Mississippi
Democratic Party members of the United States House of Representatives from Mississippi
Mississippi lawyers
American slave owners
Writers from Mississippi
American male non-fiction writers
19th-century American historians
19th-century American male writers
Burials in Mississippi